Crystal Reports is a business intelligence application marketed to small- and medium-sized businesses by SAP.

History
Terry Cunningham and the Cunningham Group originated the software in 1984.  Crystal Services Inc. marketed the product (originally called "Quik Reports") when they could not find a suitable commercial report writer for an accounting software they developed add-on products for, which was ACCPAC Plus for DOS (later acquired by SAGE).  After producing versions 1.0 through 3.0, Crystal Services was acquired by Seagate Technology in 1994. Crystal Services was combined with Holistic Systems to form the Information Management Group of Seagate Software, which later rebranded as Crystal Decisions and produced versions 4.0 through 9.0. Crystal Decisions was acquired in December 2003 by BusinessObjects, which produced versions 10, 11 (XI) and version 12 (2008).

SAP acquired BusinessObjects on October 8, 2007, and released Crystal Reports 2011 (version 14) on May 3, 2011. The latest version released is Crystal Reports 2020 (14.3.x) on June 13, 2020.

The file extension for Crystal Reports' proprietary file format is .rpt. The design file can be saved without data, or with data for later viewing or sharing. Introduced with the release of Crystal Reports 2011 (version 14.0), the read-only .rptr file extension option allows for viewing, but cannot be modified once exported.

Several other applications, including Microsoft Visual Studio versions 2003 through 2008, and Borland Delphi, at one time bundled an OEM version of Crystal Reports as a general purpose reporting tool.  Microsoft discontinued this practice and later released their own competing reporting tool, SQL Server Reporting Services (SSRS).

Versions and editions

 A=Advanced Developer, D=Developer, P=Professional, S=Standard

See also
 Dashboard (business)
 List of reporting software
 Jasper Reports

References

Bibliography

External links
 
 SAP.com Product Page
Reporting software